Tanner Township is a civil township in Kidder County, North Dakota, United States.

References

 Tanner Township on www.placenames.com

Townships in North Dakota
Populated places in Kidder County, North Dakota